"#REHASH" is the ninth episode in the eighteenth season of the American animated television series South Park. The 256th overall episode, it was written and directed by series co-creator and co-star Trey Parker. The episode premiered on Comedy Central in the United States on December 3, 2014. The episode is part one of the two-part season finale. The episode lampoons the popularity of Internet Let's Play celebrities and the phenomena of Internet trending topics that lack actual relevance. The episode also references and intertwines multiple elements from previous episodes in the eighteenth season of South Park. YouTuber PewDiePie plays himself in this episode.

Plot
Kyle rushes home to play video games and bond with his brother Ike. However, Ike is not interested, as he is instead watching a video of Internet celebrity PewDiePie offering video game commentary online, a practice known as Let's Play (LP). Kyle is perplexed that Ike and other children seem to be entertained more by rehashed content. Despite Kyle's dismissal of LP, Cartman soon takes up the hobby himself, offering commentary on videos he recorded of Kyle and Stan, which infuriates Kyle, in particular because among Cartman's subscribers is Ike.

Meanwhile, Randy Marsh learns of an upcoming local benefit concert that will feature a roster of top pop musicians, including his female stage persona, Lorde. Randy calls his producer to refuse to play the concert, due to his reliance on pitch correction software, but the producer reminds Randy that he needs the money due to his son Stan's spending on freemium gaming. Reluctantly, Randy decides to appear at the concert when his daughter, Shelley Marsh, expresses a desire to see her idol, Lorde in concert, because, as Shelley explains, Lorde is "real".

Backstage at the concert, Randy again hesitates to go on stage, but his producer tells him that the audience does not care what singers sound like, telling Randy, "Just go out there and pump your hips and rub your clit." When Randy says that is not what his music is about, Iggy Azalea perceives this as self-importance on Randy's part, and gets into a brief altercation with him. Later, when Azalea performs with a hologram of Michael Jackson, Randy feels like something is being "lost" by rehashing dead celebrities.

Kyle invites Ike's friends over to his house to play video games, but all of them are watching various video game commentary channels on their mobile devices in Ike's bedroom. When told that video games should be played in the living room, the children dismiss Kyle and Stan as out-of-touch "grandpas", while Stan is convinced that his own generation is superior to theirs, and Kyle perceives his living room to be "dying".

When Randy's performance begins, his off-key singing and poor live performance turn the fans against him. He accidentally sets the Michael Jackson hologram free, and then rubs his groin in an attempt to win the audience back, but this only makes them angrier and leads to a disillusioned Shelley tearing her Lorde poster off her bedroom wall. When Randy calls his producer, his producer says that pop star fame has never been about music, but the publicity generated by performers' antics, which Randy has now generated. Randy resolves to reveal his identity publicly.

Meanwhile, the Jackson hologram is seen on a bus heading toward South Park, because as he explains, he needs to "take care of some important business". In response to his escape, the company that created him, Syntech Hologram Company, activates their hologram of Tupac Shakur, who steals a car and goes out in pursuit of Jackson.

Randy meets with his producer to tell him that he will reveal publicly that he is Lorde. The producer responds that artists are merely exploited to generate revenue, and that a hologram of Lorde will appear on The Tonight Show Starring Jimmy Fallon, and will expose her anus to create more publicity. Seeing Randy as an obstacle to this plan, the producer's henchmen attempt to restrain Randy, but Randy escapes to his home. When he tells his wife Sharon this, she is incredulous that she just slept with a hologram, though the hologram turns out to be Shakur's, and not Randy's.

Randy's producer conspires with Cartman to install Cartman as the leader in an upcoming social media revolution involving holograms.

Production
Trey Parker and Matt Stone said on the DVD audio commentary that this episode was originally two separate episodes, one about PewDiePie and one about Lorde. This plan did not materialize because they couldn't figure out an ending that would be long enough to fill up the time for either show. To rectify this, they intended to put them together to make one episode. However, this didn't work either because Parker had written a lot of good material and now felt it needed to be a three-part story arc episode. They considered actually doing this but expected problems with Comedy Central. After shifting back and forth between one episode and three episodes, they finally settled on two partway through the production cycle. In hindsight, they thought it would have been better off if they made it a three-part story.

The scene in which Randy/Lorde is at the concert and gets into a fight with Iggy Azalea was originally going to be used as the final scene for "The Cissy", the third episode of this season. This idea was scrapped with the intention to use it later; it was used in this episode, but with a few modifications. Sia was originally present but was at some point removed and Randy was going to get in a fight with everyone else, not just one person.

The PewDiePie story originated from Parker having similar experiences to Kyle that he had with his step-son. Another influence of the story was the fact that Parker and Stone felt that more people experienced South Park: The Stick of Truth, their video game, through PewDiePie than by actually buying and playing the game themselves. They thought it would be fun to "rip" on this.

Parker and Stone said that making this episode, and the second part, made them feel old, mainly because the episodes deal with newer things that young people are interested in, such as new technology, pop music, and the focus on Internet. This is also where the title came from; things like Twitter, YouTube Let's Play, and the Internet in general, sometimes feel like places where all people do is "rehash each other's shit", an opinion that is shared by several characters in the episode.

Reception
The episode received a B+ rating from The A.V. Club's Eric Thurn, who commented "at first this seemed like a pretty good, if also a bit scatter-brained episode of South Park", but praised the continuity shown in both this episode and the entire season.

Max Nicholson from IGN gave the episode a 7.8 out of 10, stating "in terms of sheer meta-ness, this week's #Rehash was off the charts."

Chris Longo from Den of Geek gave the episode 2.5 out of 5 stars and called it "an episode that throws a lot of fun ideas at us with nothing to balance them out."

References

External links
 "Rehash" Full episode at South Park Studios
 

Cross-dressing in television
Cultural depictions of Michael Jackson
Cultural depictions of Tupac Shakur
Holography in television
Television episodes about the Internet
Television episodes about Internet culture
Television episodes about social media
South Park episodes in multiple parts
South Park (season 18) episodes
Television episodes with live action and animation